Trout Run is an  tributary of the Cacapon River, belonging to the Potomac River and Chesapeake Bay watersheds. The stream is located in Hardy County in West Virginia's Eastern Panhandle. Trout Run rises between Devils Hole Mountain and Great North Mountain near the Virginia state line in the George Washington National Forest. The stream empties into the Cacapon River at Wardensville.

Tributaries
Tributary streams are listed in order from south (source) to north (mouth).
Deep Gutter Run
Halfmoon Run
Thorny Bottom Run

List of communities along Trout Run
Rockland
Perry
Wardensville

See also
List of West Virginia rivers

References

Rivers of Hardy County, West Virginia
Rivers of West Virginia
Tributaries of the Potomac River